William Sanford Hults (June 18, 1906 – November 13, 1999) was an American politician from New York.

Early life
He was born on June 18, 1906, in Port Washington, Nassau County, New York. He attended the local schools, and then joined his father's contracting business.

Career 
Hults was a member of the New York State Assembly (Nassau Co., 2nd D.) in 1943 and 1944. He was a member of the New York State Senate (3rd D.) from 1945 to 1959, sitting in the 165th, 166th, 167th, 168th, 169th, 170th, 171st and 172nd New York State Legislatures.

He resigned his seat, and was appointed on April 1, 1959, by Gov. Nelson Rockefeller as New York State Commissioner of Motor Vehicles. On November 10, 1966, he tendered his resignation as Commissioner, effective December 31. Afterwards he moved to West Palm Beach, Florida.

Personal life 
He married Ann E. (1909–1996), and they had two children. Hults died on November 13, 1999; and was buried at the Lake Worth Memory Gardens in Lake Worth, Florida.

See also 

 Joseph P. Kelly (New York politician)

Sources

External links
 

1906 births
1999 deaths
People from Port Washington, New York
Republican Party New York (state) state senators
Republican Party members of the New York State Assembly
People from West Palm Beach, Florida
20th-century American politicians